Roberti may refer to:

People
Carlo Roberti de' Vittori (1605–1673), Roman Catholic cardinal
Ercole de' Roberti (c. 1451–1496), also known as Ercole Ferrarese or Ercole da Ferrara, was an Italian artist
Franco Roberti (born 1947), Italian magistrate and politician
Gerolamo Frigimelica Roberti (1653-1732), Italian architect, librettist, and poet
Jean Roberti (also Johannes) (1569—1651), Jesuit and theological writer
Lyda Roberti (1906–1938), Russian-born American stage and film actress, and singer
Margherita Roberti, American operatic soprano
Maria Grazia Roberti (born 1966), Italian female mountain runner and snowshoe runner
Roberto Roberti (bishop) (1575–1624), Roman Catholic prelate
Roberto Roberti (1879–1959), Italian actor, screenwriter and film director
Sarina Roberti (born 1963), Belgian rhythmic gymnast
Sebastiano Roberti or Settimio Vittori (1573–1668), Roman Catholic prelate
Vito Roberti (1911–1998), Italian prelate of the Catholic Church

Other
Alloperla roberti, species of insect in the family Chloroperlidae
Amphisbaena roberti, species of worm lizard in the family Amphisbaenidae
Avenionia roberti, aquatic gastropod mollusk or micromollusk in the family Hydrobiidae
Conasprella roberti, marine gastropod mollusk in the family Conidae
Oecomys roberti, rodent species from South America in the genus Oecomys
Pseudambassis roberti, species of fish in the family Ambassidae